The Hellenic Navy is the naval warfare service branch of the Armed Forces of Greece. As of 2022 the navy operates a wide variety of vehicles including: 13 frigates, 10 gunboats, 19 missile boats, 10 submarines and aircraft.

Ships

Aircraft

See also

List of current Greek frigates
List of decommissioned ships of the Hellenic Navy
List of former equipment of the Hellenic Armed Forces

References

Greece

Ships